(born 1939) is a Japanese mathematician. Azuma's inequality in probability theory is named after him.

Publications

References

External links
 , archived at the Internet Archive
 Partial Bibliography at CiNii (also here, and perhaps at other slightly variant names)

1939 births
Living people
20th-century Japanese mathematicians
21st-century Japanese mathematicians